Hollyoaks is a British television soap opera that was first broadcast on Channel 4 on 23 October 1995. The following is a list of characters that first appear in the show in 2022, by order of first appearance. All characters are introduced by the programme's executive producer Lucy Allan. Zain Rizwaan (Jonas Khan) and Zoe Anderson (Garcia Brown) made their debut appearances in February. They were followed by Eric Foster (Angus Castle-Doughty), the brother of Tony (Nick Pickard) and Verity Hutchinson (Eva O'Hara). Nadira Valli (Ashling O'Shea), a love interest for Shaq Qureshi (Omar Maalik), began appearing in March, and in April, Glynis Barber joined the cast as gangster Norma Crow. May marked the first appearance of Vicky Grant (Anya Laurence), a foster child for Scott Drinkwell (Ross Adams), and she was followed by her boyfriend, Joseph Holmes (Olly Rhodes), in June. Matt Lapinskas also made a guest appearance in June as Alex Ramsdan. October saw Jon-Paul Bell cast as Beau Ramsey, the long-lost son of Tony Hutchinson (Nick Pickard). Shing Lin Leong (Izzie Yip) then debuted in December as Honour Chen-Williams' (Vera Chok) niece. Additionally, multiple other characters appeared throughout the year.

Zain Rizwaan
Zain Rizwaan (also Randeri), played by Jonas Khan, made his first appearance on 21 February 2022. The character and casting was announced on 15 February 2022. Zain is an iman and was introduced to serve as a love interest for Misbah Maalik (Harvey Virdi) when he arrives in the village. Zain was billed as an "agony aunt" for the character and others in the village. On his casting, Khan said that he was excited to join Hollyoaks due to its progressiveness, feeling that the soap "always looks to push boundaries". Of his character, the actor said that he "will look to bring some spirituality and guidance to the Maalik family and rest of the village".

Zoe Anderson
Zoe Anderson, played by Garcia Brown, made her first appearance on 21 February 2022. Zoe is a police officer and the granddaughter of Pearl Anderson (Dawn Hope). The detective is described as a wild child, who is quick to cut loose and party when she's not on the job, and will quickly form friendships with some of the other female characters in the village. Her arrival in the village is spurred by the demotion of police officer Saul Reeves (Chris Charles). Stephen Patterson of the Metro described Zoe as an energetic, vivacious and headstrong character and noted that while she is a good detective during the day, she loves to party during the night. On her casting, Brown said: "Joining the Hollyoaks family has been super exhilarating! I didn't know what to expect coming into the show but I felt right at home the moment I got here, and I'm super excited for what's in store." Brown hinted that there is "more than meets the eye" for Zoe and expressed her eagerness for viewers to meet her character.

Wendy Blissett
Wendy Blissett, played by Jennifer Armour, made her first appearance on 4 March 2022. She was introduced as the daughter of Silas Blissett (Jeff Rawle) and the great-aunt of Bobby Costello (Jayden Fox). She is invited to the village by Mercedes McQueen (Jennifer Metcalfe) when she believes that Bobby has been speaking to her through an app. Although at first appearing wanting to help Mercedes with Bobby, even stopping her from taking cocaine, it is eventually revealed she is actually working with Silas to take Bobby away from the McQueen family.  Wendy departs on 21 June 2022. She is then killed off-screen in a suspicious road traffic accident, with it being heavily implied that Silas had something to do with it.

Eric Foster

Eric Foster, played by Angus Castle-Doughty, made his first appearance on 8 March 2022. Eric is the estranged brother of established characters Tony Hutchinson (Nick Pickard) and Verity Hutchinson (Eva O'Hara), and Verity  welcomes the socially awkward Eric into the village. It was confirmed that Eric's arrival would kick off a new storyline for the family, with their dynamic set to be examined.

Speaking about joining the show, Castle-Doughty said: "From the moment I started, I've felt really welcomed into the fold. Eva and I clicked straight away – we've had many discussions about our characters' relationship. Eric's upcoming storyline is topical, important, and one which hasn't been covered in soap before, and we are working really hard to do it justice."

Nadira Valli

Nadira Valli, played by Ashling O'Shea, made her first appearance on 25 March 2022. She was introduced as a love interest for Shaq Qureshi (Omar Maalik), his old childhood friend and classmate. The pair rekindle their connection at a matchmaking event led by Nadira. Digital Spy's Jess Bacon wrote that Nadira is a feisty, fun and assertive character and hinted that she would be able to "hold her own" against Shaq. Speaking more about Nadira, O'Shea said: "She has a huge heart, a sarcastic mouth and a lot going on in her mind right now... I can't wait for people to get to know her." Of her casting, she said: "Joining Hollyoaks has been such a surreal experience. I've grown up watching the show, and their hard-hitting storylines, so it's a privilege as an actor to be able to be a part of that legacy." O'Shea said that the majority of her scenes had been with Maalik, whom she had formed a close friendship with during her time on set. She said that they clicked from the moment they had met, which she felt was beneficial for their scenes since the characters have known each other for years.

It was later confirmed that Nadira would have a sexuality arc, with her realising that she is attracted to women after kissing Juliet Nightingale (Niamh Blackshaw), a client of hers. O'Shea said that Nadira feels awful about kissing Juliet since she wants to help fix Juliet's relationship with her fiancée, Peri Lomax (Ruby O'Donnell). On her character telling her family about her sexuality, O'Shea explained: "For all she knows they might embrace her. Nadira is scared of bringing shame and knows it can be hard to live authentically as a queer person in today's society." Nadira is further stressed after Shaq proposes to her, which Nadira feels is "completely out of the blue – though once she rationalises it she realises it could make a lot of sense." The situation becomes more confusing for Nadira when Shaq's ex-girlfriend, Verity Hutchinson (Eva O'Hara), becomes involved.

Norma Crow

Norma Crow, played by Glynis Barber, made her first appearance on 29 April 2022. Norma is a gangster who makes her first appearance in a hearse looking for someone who has been stealing her money. Speaking about joining the show, Barber said: "I'm really excited to be playing Norma as she's an amazing character. Formidable, complex and taking on the men and leaving them quaking in their boots. The team and cast at Hollyoaks have been incredibly welcoming and I can't wait to get my teeth into the character."

Talking to the Radio Times about her role, Barber said that Norma is her most evil character yet and that everyone is scared of her. She admitted that she did not expect to appear on Hollyoaks and that she had turned down roles on the soap in the past due to the roles "not grabbing [her] enough that [she would] want to commit". However, she felt that Norma would be a captivating role and was glad to have taken it, and joked that driving around in a hearse is an unusual mode of transport. Barber said that despite Hollyoaks having numerous villains, they are "small fry" in comparison to Norma since she has a large criminal empire with contacts and informers situated everywhere. She added: "Nothing gets past her and she will spot a weakness and exploit it. Norma is very smart and never wings it. Something she says early on is: 'Always do your research,' if you cross her, she’ll find out everything there is to know about you and use it to her advantage. I've yet to see a soft side and I'm not sure there is one. In her business she can't afford to drop her guard for a second or she’ll be killed. The reasons she chose this path will become apparent and people will be shocked at the decisions she's made."

Vicky Grant
Vicky Grant, played by Anya Lawrence, made her first appearance on 2 May 2022. Vicky is the foster daughter of Scott Drinkwell (Ross Adams), but the pair struggle to bond with Scott having expected a younger child. Vicky has been billed as "headstrong and forthright" by show bosses, but they teased that a softer side may emerge after she takes a liking to one villager.

Speaking about joining the show, Lawrence said: "Vicky is a whirlwind! She has had a really difficult start in life and is trying to find a place where she can fit in. I have come to love her, she is fierce and vulnerable, and those two contrasting characteristics make her fun to play. I am so excited to watch her develop and grow. Who knows what she will be up to next!"

On 8 February 2023, it was confirmed that Lawrence had departed Hollyoaks. Vicky’s final scenes aired on 9 February 2023.

Joseph Holmes
Joseph Holmes, played by Olly Rhodes, made his first appearance on 2 June 2022. Joseph is the boyfriend of Vicky Grant (Anya Lawrence), and his arrival will be the start of a new issues-based storyline, with show bosses teasing that his "explosive nature" will lead to consequences around the village. Joseph arrives in the village hoping to reconcile with Vicky after not hearing from her following her becomes the foster daughter of Scott Drinkwell (Ross Adams).

Speaking about his character, Rhodes said: "I'm so excited about joining Hollyoaks, it's been a great experience. Everyone is so welcoming and friendly. My character Joseph has a lot in store for the village, he's a very interesting character to be playing, and will keep you guessing his next move at every turn."

Alex Ramsdan
Alex Ramsdan, played by Matt Lapinskas, appeared on 8 June 2022. Alex appeared in an episode that was specially filmed in Mallorca. On his casting, Lapinskas told the Hollyoaks TikTok page, "I am really looking forward to joining the cast of Hollyoaks in the beautiful weather! The cast have been amazing, and it is a privilege to come out to Mallorca and be a part of Hollyoaks. It has been a dream to come and work for Hollyoaks, it has been an amazing experience so far. Just being on the beaches and looking out and thinking 'wow, this is our work environment' is something special". On his character, Lapinskas added, "Alex is a bit of a wheeler dealer, who has come over here [Mallorca] to find his fortune, which he has done. He meets the boys down here and runs a tour guide, so he takes them on their experience after they get scammed by someone, so he pulls them in, but there's a lot more than meets the eye... and he's very charming, very approachable, and that's what the boys see in him, but things take a little turn for the worse, but you'll have to wait and see what happens...".

Following his one-episode appearance, Lapinskas spoke with producers about his character's potential future on the series. He said that the meeting went "really well" and that there was potential of him returning. However, he confirmed that nothing was set, with Lapinskas continuing to audition for and book roles in other projects.

Beau Ramsey
Beau Ramsey, played by Jon-Paul Bell, made his first appearance on 20 October 2022. The character and casting was announced on 6 September 2022. Further details about the character haven't been shared, but speaking about his casting, Bell said: "Working on Hollyoaks has been an incredible experience and I'm so honoured to be a part of the passionate, creative, hard-working team here. I can't wait for viewers to meet Beau and follow him on his exciting new journey into the village, where he is sure to cause a stir for various well-known characters along the way."

Shing Lin Leong
Shing Lin Leong, played by Izzie Yip, made her first appearance on 12 December 2022. The character and casting was announced on 25 November 2022. Shing is the niece of Honour Chen-Williams (Vera Chok) and she arrives in the village alongside her parents, Mei Lian (Stacy Liu) and Meng Chye (Nicholas Goh) after Mason Chen-Williams (Frank Kauer) starts facing difficulties. However, it has been teased that a family secret will be revealed, completely changing Shing's life. It was revealed to be that Shing's mother had lost their life savings, meaning that Shing could no longer afford to attend boarding school and instead live with the Chen-Williams. The character was billed as "confident, excitable and care-free" and it was said that she is "sure to be a handful as she becomes the life of the party amongst the Hollyoaks teens."

The role is Yip's first professional acting credit, and speaking about the role, she said: "I'm really grateful to be joining the Chen-Williams family. The teens and I have been working on some pretty fun scenes; we're so excited for you to see our characters grow and watch the dynamics of a certain relationship shift around Shing Lin's intrusion. She's going to bring a touch of East Asian familiarity to your screens."

Other characters

References

, Hollyoaks
2022
Hollyoaks